Vaduvanchal  is a small town in Wayanad district in the state of Kerala, India. It is situated in the Kozhikode-Ooty road. The town is part of the Muppainad Panchayat.

Tourism
The region is full of plantations, primarily tea, coffee and rubber. The Meenmutty waterfalls and Sunrise Valley are near to the town. There are several homestays and resorts in the region, due to its proximity to tourist destinations.

See also
 Chundale town
 Kalpetta town
 Mango Orange village
 Meppadi town

References

External links
Keralatourism.org
Hillviewhomestay.com
Mustseeindia.com

Villages in Wayanad district